Steven van de Velde (born 8 August 1994, in The Hague) is a Dutch beach volleyball player and convicted rapist. Van de Velde won the Dutch national championships Under-20 in 2011. With partner Michiel van Dorsten he represented the Netherlands at the 2015 European Games. Together with partner Dirk Boehlé, he finished 3rd at the Blooming Beach Aalsmeer of the 2018 FIVB Beach Volleyball World Tour. In 2016, he was accused of raping a minor while travelling to England.

Crime
In March 2016, Van de Velde admitted to four counts of rape against a 12-year-old child, and was placed on the Violent and Sex Offender Register indefinitely. He was sentenced to serve four years in a UK prison. After finishing his sentence he was given the chance to resume his career as a beach volleyball player, and continued playing with his partner Dirk Boehlé.

References

1994 births
Living people
Volleyball players
European Games competitors for the Netherlands
Beach volleyball players at the 2015 European Games
21st-century Dutch people